Grevillea mollis, commonly known as soft grevillea, is a species of flowering plant in the family Proteaceae and is endemic to a restricted area of north-eastern New South Wales. It is an open, spreading shrub with oblong to elliptic leaves and loose clusters of bright scarlet red flowers.

Description
The upper surface is covered with soft hairs, the lower side with shaggy hairs and the edges are wavy.

Taxonomy
Grevillea mollis was first formally described in 1994 by Peter M. Olde and Bill Molyneux in the journal  Telopea from specimens collected in 1993 in the Gibraltar Range National Park. The specific epithet (mollis) means "soft", referring to the texture of the leaves.

Distribution and habitat
Soft grevillea grows on ridges, rocky slopes and creek flats in tall forest and is only known from the Gibraltar Range and Nymboida national parks in north-eastern New South Wales.

Conservation status
This grevillea is listed as "endangered" under the Australian Government Environment Protection and Biodiversity Conservation Act 1999 and the New South Wales Government Biodiversity Conservation Act 2016. The main threats to the species are its small population size and restricted distribution, inappropriate fire regimes and visitor impacts.

References 

mollis
Flora of New South Wales
Endangered flora of Australia
Proteales of Australia
Plants described in 1994